Stylistics is the study of language and its context. Stylistics may also refer to:

 The Stylistics, a Philadelphia soul group
 The Stylistics (album), a 1971 album by the group